A Couple is a 2022 French-language drama film directed by Frederick Wiseman. Featuring a solo performance by Nathalie Boutefeu as Sophia Tolstaya, the wife of Leo Tolstoy, the film consists of her monologues, which Wiseman and Boutefeu adapted from Tolstaya's letters and diaries. It is Wiseman's first narrative film since  (2002), and his first ever that is shot on location rather than being a filmed play.

Production
After working on a French-language production of The Belle of Amherst, Wiseman and Boutefeu developed the script based on Tolstaya's writings. The film was shot on Belle-Île off the coast of Brittany.

Release
A Couple premiered in competition at the 79th Venice International Film Festival in September 2022. It screened at the New York Film Festival in October 2022, and received a theatrical release at Film Forum in New York City in November 2022.

Reception
On review aggregator website Rotten Tomatoes, the film holds an approval rating of 87%, based on 31 reviews, and an average rating of 7.1/10. On Metacritic, the film has a weighted average score of 74 out of 100, based on 13 critics, indicating "generally favorable reviews".

References

External links
 

2020s French films
2020s American films
2022 drama films
2022 films
French drama films
American drama films
One-character films
2020s French-language films
Films shot in France
Films directed by Frederick Wiseman
Cultural depictions of Leo Tolstoy
Films based on diaries
French-language American films